Figures of Argentine tango are elements of Argentine tango.

Introduction and terminology

History
On the basis of several instructional tango books published between 1911–1925  early tango figures can be grouped into eight categories: corte, paseo, la marcha, ocho, grapevine, ruedas, media luna, molinette. From that period we still have: ocho, sentada, media luna, molinete, sandwich.

In 2010 there exists as many as 200 instructional DVDs discussing elements of Argentine tango dance.
These include titles devoted to tango technique and basics

 
tango nuevo

milonguero style (also known by estilo del centro in Buenos Aires)

 
and various elements of the dance such as giros.
 
There are many guides and dictionaries to tango terminology on the internet.
 
Tango terminology is described in several books.

Terminology
Alternative names are provided in (braces) but usage of tango related names varies: for example entrada and sacada or voleo and boleo may be used to describe the same steps. The names used here follow many sources including English instructional DVDs (such as Christy Coté and George Garcia DVDs published by Dancevision),  Argentine DVDs which often have English subtitles, internet resources, and published books and glossaries.

Basic concepts: axis, steps, embrace.

Body position and basic steps
Effective lead and elegant following depends on proper position of feet, hips, and torso of the leader and the follower.

On and off axis
Position-related concepts of Argentine tango are axis and off-axis positions. Body position in which legs are approximately perpendicular to the floor is called 'axis' and there are two axis positions associated with one of two legs. Off-axis positions are called apile (apilado, carpa, volcada) or colgada. The center of balance moves outside one's body in case of the off-axis moves.

Embrace and styles
Argentine tango dancing consists of a variety of styles that developed in different regions and eras and in response to the crowding of the venue and even the fashions in clothing. It is danced in an embrace that can vary from very open, in which the dancers connect at arm's length, to very closed, in which the connection is chest-to-chest, or anywhere in between. Styles of dance are not predefined by the embrace itself and many figures of tango salon style are danced in an open embrace, it is also possible to dance tango nuevo in close V-shape embrace.  The milonguero (apilado) style is an exception; its close embrace without V-shape and emphasis on maintaining this embrace throughout the dance predetermines range of possible movements and their shape.

Dance embraces

Practice embraces
Embrace hold used during tango practice. One example is when both partners hold hands, the follower holds the leader's shoulders, and variants.

Walk and salidas

Walking systems
Walking in a cross system is defined as the couple stepping simultaneously with their two right legs and stepping simultaneously with their two left legs.  Walking in a parallel system is defined as the couple stepping simultaneously with the leader's right and follower's left leg, and then with the leader's left and the follower's right leg. When dancers are facing each other, the cross system results in an anti-mirror effect.  For this reason, in ballroom tango cross system is never used unless both dancers are facing the same direction. Argentine tango, however, makes extensive use of the cross system with dancers facing each other.  In Argentine tango, the leader can change his weight from one foot to another while the follower's weight remains unchanged; this is the simplest method of changing from parallel system to cross system or vice versa. By contrast in ballroom tango, a weight change by one partner leads to an automatic weight change by the other.

The cross system and parallel system walk nomenclature originated with the Naveira/Salas "Investigation Group." Early on, they used 'even/uneven' to describe the arrangement of legs in the walk or turn. By the mid-1990s, they began using 'parallel/crossed' and later 'normal/crossed'. The process of changing from the parallel system to cross system (or vice versa) by having the leader change weight without the follower changing weight (or vice versa) is named contrapaso, or "contra-step". This change can be made off or on the normal beat.

Eight count basic (8CB)
Basic step (paso básico, basico cuadrado y cruzado)  is used for education purposes and almost never danced as a basic step of tango. For this reason it is sometimes called pejoratively academic basic.  Nevertheless, it contains basic elements of the dance. Also, it serves a purpose of "establishing notation" to more complex tango elements. Basic step (eight count basic, 8CB) is composed of back step, side step, cross for the lady (leader steps outside of his partner with his right leg), forward step, and side step. Basic steps can also be divided into four phases: salida – position 1 and 2 and transition from position 2 to position 3; caminata (position 3 and 4), cross (position 5), and resolution (positions 6,7,8). There are variants of the basic step.

Baldosa (tile) or cuadrado (square) is a six-step figure similar to the ballroom box step except the man starts with his right foot, then steps back, side, forward, forward, side, feet together; the baldosa is the basic step of milonga. This baldosa is similar to eight count basic with the exception of the cross.

Some Argentine tango teachers teach complex figures but break them down into simpler parts. Subsequently, they teach students how to improvise their own figures. Beginner classes may include caminada – combination of caminar (walk), cross, and ochos. The beginning part of a figure, its starting-point, is called salida (exit or beginning – as in "beginning of a journey"). The end part of a figure is called resolución. Combination of the salida, a walk, the cross of the lady and the resolución is called basic step (paso basico, la base, salida simple).

Thus, an Argentine tango figure is the pattern of salida, combination of elements, and resolución. This makes for flexible, ever-changing patterns. It gives leader an exceptional opportunity to improvise, and in part makes the Argentine tango unique in the dance world.

Salidas

Technique and embellishments

Follower's technique and embellishments
As in many dances most spectators focus on the follower – her elegance, grace, music interpretation as well as technique. Even though these are highly individual attributes there are some accepted ideas of what makes a follower graceful and beautiful when dancing tango. Such skills include leg projection and weight transfer,  stability in movements, elegance in leg placement and leg extension, pivoting, embellishments, as well as expression of emotions.

Leader's technique
Both partners can contribute to tango improvisations with adornments (sp. adornos, decoration) known also as decorations (sp. decoration). Adornments do not have to be led or marked. Several embellishments are: aguja, amague, boleo, caricia, cuatro, enroscar, golpecito, lustrada, rulo.

Expressions of emotion
Expression of emotions such as raising hand by a follower and gently lowering it on partner's shoulder; dancing with cheeks together.

Variants and shape
Tango elements come in a variety of shapes determined by, for example, elasticity or flexion of the execution of movement. Such variants gives a figure a more modern or traditional look, it can be an expression of the follower's creativity, or simple adjustment to how crowded is the floor.

Many tango steps are often borrowed from tango shows, but modified for the tight spaces and flow of other dancers around the floor. Many of these steps are part of tango nuevo. The shape of the steps can vary – for example, how the follower's body is curved during the step may change according to her interpretation of the music or the moment. There are several instructional videos illustrating sequences of tango nuevo such as colgadas and volcadas with elements of traditional tango.

Figures

Cross and ocho
Large group of classic and elegant tango figures is related to two basic steps: forward cross step and backward cross step. Their combinations form cruce (cross), ochos (figure eight), as well as giros (turns).

Circular movements
Circular movements are inherent part of tango and have special importance in tango vals. These include

Foot play
Steps related to foot play steps spice up the walk and the dance. These are ways for leaders and followers to challenge and tease their partners and make dance more playful. There are different shapes of these moves and their look depends on how crowded is the venue or the follower's interpretation of the lead.

Sacada and entrada

Gancho and enganche

Boleos

Colgada and volcada

Everything else

Ending figures
The most typical endings of tango are simple positions, for example "sandwich" or "tango close". However, in the popular culture tango endings are often associated with more dramatic figures such as listed below.

Notes and references

Tango dance
Argentine tango
Glossaries of dance
Wikipedia glossaries using tables